Zareabad (also Romanized as Zāre‘ābād) is a village in Angut-e Sharqi Rural District, Anguti District, Germi County, Ardabil Province, Iran. At the 2006 census, its population was 119, in 24 families.

References 

Towns and villages in Germi County